Zhao Jiamin (born July 22, 1998 in Shenzhen, Guangdong, China) is a Chinese idol singer. She is a former member of the female idol group SNH48, and came in first during SNH48's second General Election.

Career
On 14 October 2012, Zhao Jiamin became one of the 26 shortlisted candidates during the recruitment of SNH48 first-generation members. On 23 December, SNH48 was invited to the inauguration ceremony of the Fudan University Student Union, and she made her first performance as an SNH48 member.

On 12 January 2013, Zhao performed on SNH48 Research Students 1st Stage, "Give Me Power!", as a Research Student, and became an official member on 17 April. On 25 May, she performed on the "Blooming For You Concert" with other first-generation members, but due to an injury at the waist, she was unable to perform on most of the songs. On 28 May, she starred in SNH48's first web drama, Mengxiang Yubei Sheng. She made her first public performance as a first-generation member on 30 August, with the opening of the SNH48 Theatre. On 11 November, Zhao was assigned to Team SII during the formation of teams.

On 26 July 2014, Zhao garnered 11,079 votes during the 2014 General Election and was ranked third. On 14 November, she recorded the theme song of mobile game Mo Tian Ji, "缘尽世间", with Ju Jingyi and Xu Jiaqi.

On 1 January 2015, Zhao was crowned the winner in the 2014 Baidu Tieba Live Performance Annual Chart and was given the chance to record a solo song. On 1 April, she released her solo single, "Mushi no Ballad". On 30 April, she made her second film appearance by starring in micro-movie MoTian Jie for mobile game Mo Tian Ji. On 25 July, she won SNH48's 2015 General Election with 74,393 votes. On 13 September, she became part of SNH48's first sub-unit Seine River with Ju Jingyi and Li Yitong, and released their first EP, "Sweet & Bitter". On 8 October, she was involved in the filming for Run for Time.

In February 2016, Zhao applied for the entrance examination to get into the Central Academy of Drama, during which she took an indefinite hiatus from SNH48. She was ranked 10th overall and started school in July 2016.

Discography

With SNH48

EPs

Albums
 Mae Shika Mukanee (2014)

With Seine River
 Sweet & Bitter (2015)

Units

SNH48 Stage Units

Concert units

Filmography

Movies

Variety shows

Endorsements

References

External links
 Official Member Profile 
 
 

1998 births
Living people
SNH48 members
People from Shenzhen
Actresses from Guangdong
Chinese child singers
Chinese Mandopop singers
Chinese film actresses
Chinese television actresses
21st-century Chinese actresses
Hakka musicians
Central Academy of Drama alumni